Nantapol Supathai is a Thai professional footballer who plays for Phrae United in the Thai League 3.
He was voted the best goalkeeper in the 2010 Thai Division 1 League.

External links
Thai Premier League Profile in English
Thai Premier League Profile in Thai
https://web.archive.org/web/20120430012529/http://www.thaipremierleague.co.th/news_detail.php?nid=00216

1982 births
Living people
Nantapol Supathai
Nantapol Supathai
Nantapol Supathai
Nantapol Supathai
Nantapol Supathai
Association football goalkeepers